McLucas is a surname. Notable people with the surname include:

Alan McLucas, Australian Paralympic athlete
Jan McLucas (born 1958), Australian politician
John L. McLucas (1920–2002), United States Secretary of the Air Force
Lonnie McLucas, Black Panther Party member